Kathmandu 7 is one of 10 parliamentary constituencies of Kathmandu District for the House of Representatives. The constituency in the current form was created during the first constituent assembly election in 2008 and has remained unchanged since then. It consists of wards 16, 17, 18 and 25 of Kathmandu Metropolitan City, wards 1, 2 and 3 of Nagarjun Municipality and wards 3, 4 and 5 of  Tarakeshwar Municipality. The current parliamentarian from this constituency is Ganesh Parajuli of Rastriya Swatantra Party.

Assembly segments 
It encompasses the following Bagmati Province Provincial Assembly segments.

 Kathmandu 7(A)
 Kathmandu 7(B)

Members of Parliament

Parliament/Constituent Assembly

Provincial Assembly

7(A)

7(B)

Election results

Election in the 2020s

2022 general election

Election in the 2010s

2017 Legislative Election

2017 provincial elections

Kathmandu 7(A)

Kathmandu 7(B)

2013 Constituent Assembly Election

Election in the 2000s

2008 Constituent Assembly Election

Election in the 1990s

1999 legislative election

1994 legislative elections

See also 

 List of parliamentary constituencies of Nepal

References

External links 

 Constituency map of Kathmandu

Parliamentary constituencies of Nepal
Constituencies established in 2008
2008 establishments in Nepal